Henry Wirt Newkirk (August 1, 1854April 1, 1946) was a Michigan politician.

Early life
Newkirk was born on August 1, 1854 in Dexter, Michigan. Newkirk lived in Bay City, Michigan in 1879.

Education
Newkirk graduated from the University of Michigan Law School in 1879.

Career
In 1884, Newkirk moved to Williamsburg, Kentucky, where he founded the Williamsburg Times newspaper. Newkirked moved back to Michigan in Lake County to publish Luther Enterprise in 1888. Newkirk was appointed to the position of interim Lake County prosecuting attorney in 1889. He was elected to this position in 1890, and served in it until 1892. In 1892, Newkirk was an alternate delegate to Republican National Convention from Michigan. On November 8, 1892, Newkirk was elected to the Michigan House of Representatives where he represented the Osceola County district from January 4, 1893 to 1894. Newkirk served as Washtenaw County probate judge from 1897 to 1900. In 1899, Newkirk became the namesake for Newkirk Township, Michigan. On November 6, 1906, Newkirk was elected to the Michigan House of Representatives where he represented the Washtenaw County 1st district from January 2, 1907 to 1910. He was once again elected to his position on November 7, 1916 and served from January 3, 1917 to 1918. Newkirk served as mayor of Ann Arbor from 1931 to 1933.

Personal life
In 1880, Newkirk married Eleanor J. Birkett. Newkirk was a member of the Shriners, the Odd Fellows, and the Woodmen. Newkirk was a Freemason.

Death
Newkirk died on April 1, 1946 in St. Petersburg, Florida.

References

1854 births
1946 deaths
People from Dexter, Michigan
People from Lake County, Michigan
American Freemasons
Michigan lawyers
Republican Party members of the Michigan House of Representatives
University of Michigan Law School alumni
Mayors of Ann Arbor, Michigan
19th-century American lawyers
19th-century American politicians
20th-century American politicians
19th-century American judges
20th-century American judges